Lyudmila Guryeva (born 12 March 1977) is a Kazakhstani biathlete. She competed in the two events at the 1998 Winter Olympics.

References

1977 births
Living people
Biathletes at the 1998 Winter Olympics
Kazakhstani female biathletes
Olympic biathletes of Kazakhstan
Place of birth missing (living people)
Asian Games medalists in biathlon
Biathletes at the 1999 Asian Winter Games
Asian Games gold medalists for Kazakhstan
Medalists at the 1999 Asian Winter Games
20th-century Kazakhstani women